Aguk Shain was an 8th-century Chechen commander in the Arab-Khazar Wars.

Shain is mentioned in the book Yu Aidaeva "Chechens: Past and Present", where he is described as the head of the Chechen-auhovtsev (auharov), which was involved in the Khazar wars with the Arabs. He was, the author assumes, the second person in the Khazar army. In addition, excavations on the outskirts of the Giachalk (Khazar-Kala) village show that he had close economic ties with Akkins Khazars.

Shain led some of the Khazar troops. This confirmed the inclusion of Chechens in the Khazar Khanate, to which they were loyal.

The 735–736 Arabic commander Nirvana managed to destroy the fortress "Hasni-Hisnumma" (Khazar-Kala) and capture the fortress auhovs "Kesh" ("Keshen" Keshne). These fortresses were inhabited by Chechens auhar (Akkins); however, he was then captured himself.

Literature 
 Аккинцы: вопросы этногенеза
 Чеченцы-аккинцы (ауховцы) и их гражданские формирования

References 

History of Chechnya
Medieval military leaders
Khazars
8th-century military history
8th-century Asian people